Estadio Áristocles Toco Castillo is a football stadium in Veraguas, Panama which hosts Liga Profesional de Fútbol teams Atlético Veragüense , Veraguas Club Deportivo, and other teams and local competitions from the Veraguas Province.

Formerly the stadium had smaller dimensions and natural turf, but it was still used for ANAPROF games. In 2008, a joint effort from the Panamanian government and the national sport institute (INDE) spent $449,104 in installing artificial turf to the field and increase its dimensions to 101x68 m.

The stadium was inaugurated on January 18, 2009 and the first Liga Panameña de Fútbol game in the renewed stadium was played on Sunday March 1, 2009 when Atlético Veragüense defeated Alianza 4-3 in the 2009 championship. The first goal in  the renewed stadium was scored by Abdul Pinto of Alianza.

Football venues in Panama
Buildings and structures in Veraguas Province
Santiago de Veraguas